The  is a pilgrimage circuit that is composed of the following three independent pilgrimage circuits:

 , in the Kansai region. 
 , in the Kantō region. 
 , in Chichibu, Saitama.

The Chichibu 34 Kannon pilgrimage originally had 33 temples, but in 1525 another one was added in order have a hundred temples when joined to the circuits of the Saigoku and Bandō pilgrimages.

See also
 Shikoku Pilgrimage, 88 Temple pilgrimage in the Shikoku island.
 Musashino Kannon Pilgrimage, pilgrimage in Tokyo and Saitama prefectures.
 Chūgoku 33 Kannon, pilgrimage in the Chūgoku region.
 Kannon
 For an explanation of terms concerning Japanese Buddhism, Japanese Buddhist art, and Japanese Buddhist temple architecture, see the Glossary of Japanese Buddhism.

References

Buddhism in Japan
Buddhist pilgrimages
Japanese pilgrimages